Retarder may refer to:

 Retarder (album), an album by The Unband
 Retarder (chemistry), a chemical agent that slows down a chemical reaction
 Retarder (mechanical engineering), a device for slowing down large trucks, lorries, buses, coaches and other vehicles
 Retarder (railroad), a device to slow railroad freight cars as they are sorted into trains
 Acrylic retarder, a chemical agent added to fine art acrylic paint to slow its short drying time
 Dough retarder, a refrigerator used to slow down proofing of yeast when making dough
 Retardation plate, an optical device that alters the polarization state of a light wave traveling through it

See also
 Retardation (disambiguation)